Packera pauciflora is a species of flowering plant in the aster family known by the common name alpine groundsel. It is native to northern North America, where it can be found in parts of western and eastern Canada and the northwestern United States. It grows in subalpine and alpine climates, such as mountain meadows.

It is a perennial herb producing one or more erect stems up to half a meter tall from a thick caudex and fibrous root system. The basal leaves have thick, toothed blades up to 4 centimeters long, and those higher on the stem have smaller, more dissected leaves. The inflorescence bears a single flower head or an umbel-shaped array of up to 6 heads. Each head has green to reddish or purplish phyllaries, many disc florets, and often several ray florets. The florets may be most any shade of red, orange, or yellow.
The specific epithet pauciflora is Latin for 'few-flowered'.

References

External links
Jepson Manual Treatment
USDA Plants Profile
Flora of North America
Washington Burke Museum
UC CalPhotos gallery

pauciflora
Flora of Western Canada
Flora of the Western United States
Flora of the West Coast of the United States
Flora of California
Flora of Colorado
Flora of the Rocky Mountains
Flora of the Sierra Nevada (United States)
Taxa named by Frederick Traugott Pursh
Flora without expected TNC conservation status